Mokey is a 1942 comedy-drama film released by MGM, directed by Wells Root and starring Donna Reed, Dan Dailey, and Robert Blake.

Plot

Cast

 Dan Dailey as Herbert Delano
 Donna Reed as Athena Delano
 Robert Blake as Daniel "Mokey" Delano
 Cordell Hickman as Booker T. Cumby
 Billie Thomas as Brother Cumby
 Etta McDaniel as Cindy Molishus
 Marcella Moreland as Begonia Cumby
 George Lloyd as Policeman Pat Esel
 Matt Moore as Mr. Pennington
 Cleo Desmond as Aunt Deedy
 Cliff Clark as Mr. Graham
 Mary Field as Mrs. Graham
 Bobby Stebbins as Brickley "Brick" Autry
 Sam McDaniel as Uncle Ben

Reception
The film made $179,000 in the US and Canada and $98,000 elsewhere during its initial theatrical run, earning MGM a loss of $205,000.

References

External links

Mokey at TCMDB

1942 films
1942 comedy-drama films
American black-and-white films
American comedy-drama films
Films about children
Films based on short fiction
Films scored by Lennie Hayton
Metro-Goldwyn-Mayer films
1940s English-language films
1940s American films